Ayrton Simmons (born 29 April 2001) is a British-Spanish racing driver, who last competed in the 2022 Euroformula Open Championship. He previously competed in the 2022 FIA Formula 3 Championship for Charouz Racing System. He is the vice-champion of the 2018 F4 British and the 2021 GB3 Championship.

Career

Karting 
Simmons started his international karting career at the age of 5 in small Spanish championships and won the Rotax Max Challenge Grand Finals in the Micro Max category in 2012. He then competed in various national championships, such as the Super 1 Championships and Kartmasters British Grand Prix. He raced in karts until 2015.

F4 British Championship

2016 
Simmons made his car racing debut in the third round of the 2016 F4 British Championship with the TRS Arden Junior Racing Team at the age of 15. His form improved from round to round, culminating with his first podium at the final race of the season. This led to him finishing eleventh in the overall standings and second in the rookie cup.

2017 
He continued to race in the series in 2017 with the same team, this time for the whole season. Simmons started his season off strongly with a victory at Brands Hatch, Simmons scored five more podiums and ended up seventh in the championship, three and five positions behind teammates Alex Quinn and Oscar Piastri, respectively.

2018 
Simmons stayed on for a third season in British F4, this time competing with JHR Developments. Simmons again started strongly and had his best season, taking two wins in the first round at Brands Hatch. Simmons would win again at the fourth round in Oulton Park before claiming his last win during the eighth round at the Knockhill Racing Circuit. Overall, he scored four wins and eight further podiums on his way to second in the standings, 71 points behind champion Kiern Jewiss.

BRDC Formula 3 Championship

2018 
In 2018, Simmons made his debut in the BRDC British Formula 3 Championship with Chris Dittmann Racing, scoring 88 points and finishing 19th in the standings.

2019 
For the 2019 season, the Brit made a deal to race in the championship on a full-time basis. He scored his first podiums in the opening round at Oulton Park and achieved his first win at Silverstone in the third race. His next race win came at Spa-Francorchamps, however, by then he had already lost ground to his championship rivals Clément Novalak and Johnathan Hoggard. Simmons won another race at the second Silverstone round and finished third in the overall standings, just 55 points behind champion Novalak. At the end of the year, he was selected in the final four for the 2019 Aston Martin BRDC Award, but it was eventually won by British F3 rival Johnathan Hoggard.

Midway through the season in May, Simmons joined the 2019 F3 Asian Championship. He partook in two rounds and ended tenth in the standings.

2020 
In 2020, Simmons made two appearances in British F3, one with Chris Dittmann Racing and one with JHR Developments, respectively. He scored two podiums in each of the rounds and amassed two victories at Brands Hatch. Despite those two rounds, Simmons still ranked 17th in the standings.

2021 
The 2021 BRDC British Formula 3 Championship was the fourth season Simmons competed at that level. Returning to Chris Dittmann Racing, Simmons won the first race of the season at a weekend where he secured both pole positions. His next win would come at the next round in Silverstone during the last race. In the second Silverstone round, he took two victories, which were his last of the year. However, the championship was largely dominated by the eventual champion Zak O'Sullivan. Simmons settled for vice-champion with four wins and one more podium.

Euroformula Open Championship

2020 
Simmons progressed to the Euroformula Open Championship in 2020 with Double R Racing. However, after just three rounds, the Brit unexpectedly stopped his campaign due to budget issues. He was left to end the standings 11th with 62 points.

2022 

After losing his Formula 3 seat, Simmons returned to the Euroformula Open with Drivex School.

On his return, he achieved a third-place podium in his second race at the Hungaroring. Simmons remained with Drivex for Imola, but the team did not turn up for that weekend. Despite that, Simmons would return with the team for the next round at the Red Bull Ring. Once again, for the next round, Drivex was absent for the Monza round. Simmons did return for the last round at Circuit de Barcelona-Catalunya, and scored a second place in the second race. He ended the year 10th in the standings, with 85 points.

FIA Formula 3 Championship

2021 
On 20 September 2021 it was announced Simmons would step up to the FIA Formula 3 Championship for the final round of the season at Sochi Autodrom, replacing Hunter Yeany at Charouz Racing System. He finished both of his races in 24th and 21st place, respectively.

2022 
Simmons remained with the team for the full 2022 season. Starting 29th in Bahrain, he made good progress in the races, taking 18th and 19th place. However, budget issues forced Simmons out of the championship, and he was replaced by former Charouz driver David Schumacher. Simmons ended the championship 35th in the standings.

Personal life 
Simmons was born in Harlow, Essex to an English father and a Spanish mother, and lived in the Madrid neighbourhood of Vallecas from the age of 4 to 14 before moving back to Epping. He was named after the late three-time Formula One World Champion Ayrton Senna.

Karting record

Karting career summary

Racing record

Racing career summary 

* Season still in progress.

Complete F4 British Championship results 
(key) (Races in bold indicate pole position; races in italics indicate fastest lap)

Complete BRDC British Formula 3 Championship results 
(key) (Races in bold indicate pole position) (Races in italics indicate fastest lap)

Complete F3 Asian Championship results 
(key) (Races in bold indicate pole position) (Races in italics indicate fastest lap)
{| class="wikitable" style="text-align:center; font-size:90%"
! Year
! Team
! 1
! 2
! 3
! 4
! 5
! 6
! 7
! 8
! 9
! 10
! 11
! 12
! 13
! 14
! 15
! DC
! Points
|-
| 2019
! Pinnacle Motorsport
| style="background:#;" | SEP1
| style="background:#;" | SEP2
| style="background:#;" | SEP3
| style="background:#DFFFDF;" | CHA1
| style="background:#DFFFDF;" | CHA2
| style="background:#DFFFDF;" | CHA3
| style="background:#;" | SUZ1
| style="background:#;" | SUZ2
| style="background:#;" | SUZ3
| style="background:#EFCFFF;" | SIC11
| style="background:#DFFFDF;" | SIC12
| style="background:#DFFFDF;" | SIC13
| style="background:#;" | SIC21
| style="background:#;" | SIC22
| style="background:#;" | SIC23
! 10th
! 40
|}

 Complete Euroformula Open Championship results 
(key) (Races in bold indicate pole position) (Races in italics indicate fastest lap)  

 Complete FIA Formula 3 Championship results 
(key) (Races in bold indicate pole position; races in italics'' indicate points for the fastest lap of top ten finishers)

References

External links 
 
 

2001 births
Living people
British racing drivers
F3 Asian Championship drivers
Euroformula Open Championship drivers
BRDC British Formula 3 Championship drivers
Arden International drivers
JHR Developments drivers
Chris Dittmann Racing drivers
Pinnacle Motorsport drivers
Double R Racing drivers
Charouz Racing System drivers
British F4 Championship drivers
FIA Formula 3 Championship drivers
Drivex drivers